Eddie Dootson (born 23 August 1961) is an English darts player who currently competes in Professional Darts Corporation events.

In 2015, he reached the last 16 of the UK Open defeating Joe Cullen and Robert Thornton, before losing to Devon Petersen.

References

External links

Living people
Professional Darts Corporation former tour card holders
English darts players
1961 births